The 1910–11 Princeton Tigers men's ice hockey season was the 12th season of play for the program.

Season
Looking to defend their championship with most of the players returning, Princeton's biggest concern was finding a replacement for star netminder Clarence Peacock. Dean Kalbfleisch, who had seen limited action the year before, took over the role and played well early in the year against non-IHA opponents. After the three-game series with Yale it was apparent that Kalbfleisch wasn't the same caliber as their former captain, however, the team's offense performed much better than they had the year before so there was hope that the Tigers could repeat.

After starting league play with a win over an improved Columbia squad, Princeton was looking forward to the showdown with Harvard but first they would have to get past a Cornell that was undefeated on the season. Whether they were looking past the Big Red or not, Princeton came out flat, allowing Cornell to score the game's first four goals en route to a 1–4 defeat for the Tigers. After suffering a further loss to Dartmouth the wheels came off and the Tigers sputtered to end the season with 4-game losing streak, finishing last in the IHA.

Roster

Standings

Schedule and Results

|-
!colspan=12 style=";" | Regular Season

Scoring Statistics

Note: Assists were not recorded as a statistic.

References

Princeton Tigers men's ice hockey seasons
Princeton
Princeton
Princeton
Princeton